Daszak is a surname. Notable people with the surname include: 

John Daszak, British operatic tenor
Peter Daszak, British zoologist